Sarai Aquil is a town and a nagar panchayat in Kaushambi district in the Indian state of Uttar Pradesh.

Demographics
In 2001, the India census recorded that Sarai Akil had a population of 15,719. Males constituted 54% of the population and females 46%. Sarai Akil had an average literacy rate of 48%, lower than the national average of 59.5%: male literacy was 55% and female literacy was 39%. In Sarai Akil, 16% of the population was under 6 years of age.

References

Cities and towns in Kaushambi district
Caravanserais in India